ACDB may refer to:
African Centre for DNA Barcoding
Agriculture Cooperative and Development Bank
alternating current distribution board
Ateliers et Chantiers de Dunkerque-Bordeaux